The Force Concept Inventory is a test measuring mastery of concepts commonly taught in a first semester of physics developed by Hestenes, Halloun, Wells, and Swackhamer (1985). It was the first such "concept inventory" and several others have been developed since for a variety of topics. The FCI was designed to assess student understanding of the Newtonian concepts of force.  Hestenes (1998) found that while "nearly 80% of the [students completing introductory college physics courses] could state Newton's Third Law at the beginning of the course, FCI data showed that less than 15% of them fully understood it at the end". These results have been replicated in a number of studies involving students at a range of institutions (see sources section below), and have led to greater recognition in the physics education research community  of the importance of students' "active engagement" with the materials to be mastered.

Gender differences 
The FCI shows a gender difference in favor of males that has been the subject of some research in regard to gender equity in education. Men score on average about 10% higher.

References 

Psychological tests and scales
Physics education